Nes IK was an ice hockey team in Nes, Akershus, Norway. They last played in the First Division, the second level of Norwegian ice hockey. Nes IK withdrew from the national league system in July 2016, following failure to meet league requirements.

History
The club was founded on December 26, 1964. They played in the Norwegian First Division since the 2012-13 season. The women's team plays in the second-level women's Norwegian league.

References

External links
Official website
Team profile on eurohockey.com

Ice hockey teams in Norway
Ice hockey clubs established in 1964
1964 establishments in Norway
Sport in Akershus
Nes, Akershus